Hillview High School is a public continuation high school located in unincorporated community of North Tustin in Orange County, California, United States. It has a mailing address of Santa Ana, California; however, it is a part of the Tustin Unified School District.

References

External links
 Hillview High School website
 Tustin Unified District website

Educational institutions established in 1975
High schools in Orange County, California
Continuation high schools in California
Public high schools in California
1975 establishments in California